The moving statues phenomenon occurred during the summer of 1985 in Ireland, where, in several different parts of the country, statues of the Virgin Mary were reported to move spontaneously.

In Ballinspittle, County Cork, in July 1985, an observer claimed to have seen a roadside statue of the Virgin Mary move spontaneously. Similar occurrences were reported shortly afterward in Mount Melleray, County Waterford, and at around 30 other locations around the country. They were not all Marian apparitions. Some involved other divine figures and/or saints who appeared in stains on church walls etc. Thousands gathered at many of the sites out of curiosity or to gaze in wonder and to pray. Up to 100,000 were said to have visited the Ballinspittle site alone. The Catholic Church remained reticent or highly skeptical and a bishop declared the whole phenomenon 'an illusion'. The Ballinspittle statue was damaged by a gang of hammer-wielding Pentecostalist protesters against idolatry (or Mariolatry), but it was repaired. In 2002 the BBC planned a documentary on the phenomenon.

Though the moving statue phenomenon quickly faded, a few small 'cults' persisted for some years after the peak activity of 1985, and one set off by road to convert Russia.

Author John D. Vose set out to see for himself in his book The Statues That Moved a Nation. He interviewed witnesses who told him the most amazing stories of miraculous happenings.

A team of psychologists based in University College, Cork (UCC), recorded 31 apparition sites and explained the visions as being optical illusions caused by staring at objects in the evening twilight. Others have argued that the moving statues and other extraordinary international phenomenon like the "flying-saucer" religions and many other new religious and occult movements are best explained as responses to an existential angst that was exacerbated by the Cold War and other sources of social stress but with ultimate origins in cultural or religious norms, family dynamics, and personal psychology.

One site is about one kilometre (1000 yards) along the Ballinspittle to Kinsale road. In a ravine the life-sized blue-and white painted plaster statue of a woman stands about 4 metres (13') above the road, fronted by a balustrade of large blue concrete letters reading "I am The Immaculate Conception". The head of the statue is surrounded by small electric bulbs in the form of a halo. Across the ravine is an unfenced grassy slope with some benches. In front is a blue boilerplate box for donations, secured by two large padlocks.

A printed notice beside the grotto states that its continual upkeep is designed to keep the people of Ballinspittle focused on their veneration of the Virgin Mary, and also to inspire faith in "mere passers by".

Anthropologist Peter Mulholland argues that the continuing role of Marian apparitions in Irish popular culture is a reflection of psychological insecurity stemming largely from adverse childhood experiences and a concatenation of historical, cultural, political, religious and sociological factors.

Moving statues have also been reported in Poland, another devout Catholic country.

See also
Roman Catholicism in Ireland
Knock Shrine
Templemore apparitions
Maria Duce
Weeping Angel, an alien species in Doctor Who that resembles a moving statue.

References

Christian miracles
1985 in Ireland
Statues of the Virgin Mary
History of Catholicism in Ireland